The 1999–2000 Moldovan "B" Division was the 9th season of Moldovan football's third-tier league. There are 27 teams in the competition, in two groups, 13 in the North and 14 in the South.

"B" Division North

Final standings

"B" Division South

Final standings

External links 
 Moldova. Third Level 1999/2000 - RSSSF
 "B" Division - moldova.sports.md

Moldovan Liga 2 seasons
3
Moldova